Pulling is a British sitcom, produced by Silver River Productions and broadcast on BBC Three. It is about three single female friends who live in Hackney, East London. It was co-written by Sharon Horgan and Dennis Kelly and stars Horgan as Donna, Tanya Franks as Karen, Rebekah Staton as Louise and Cavan Clerkin as Karl. Pulling was the last comedy show developed by Harry Thompson before his death.

The first series of six episodes was first shown in 2006 on BBC Three, then repeated on BBC Two in early 2008. A second six-episode series of Pulling aired on BBC Three from 23 March to 27 April 2008 and a final one-hour episode aired on BBC Three on 17 May 2009.

In Australia, series one and two was first aired back-to-back on ABC2 each Thursday at 10pm from 5 March 2009 although the final one-hour episode is yet to be screened by the network. Repeats have been screening on rotation through UKTV.

In 2007, the series was BAFTA-nominated for Best Situation Comedy while Horgan won a British Comedy Award for Best Comedy Entertainment Actress in 2008. In the same year, it was announced that Pulling had been cancelled by BBC Three.

Main characters
In writing the series, both Sharon Horgan and Dennis Kelly agreed that the main roles needed to be female and have the funny lines.
Horgan: "There was nothing out there for me; I had to give myself a break! Peep Show has very funny female characters but they're generally girlfriends or incidental women who are just helping the story along."
Kelly:"When we were writing Pulling, we wanted to make sure the comedy was with the women. Even with comedies that are about women, it's often the blokes who get the funnies. In Pulling we even err too much the other way and make the men too two-dimensional. But it was important for the women to get the funny lines."

The main characters are :

Donna
 She is in a five-year relationship with Karl, to whom she is engaged.
 29 years old at the start of the series.
 Works in an office.

Louise
 Naive, unrealistically hopeful. 
 Works as a cafe waitress
 Happens to find herself in bizarre situations, including meeting up with voyeurs in a carpark believing it to be a dating site, and stalking a man who frequents her café.

Karen
 Heavy drinker.
 Promiscuous, outgoing, chaotic and aggressive. 
 A primary school teacher who is not suited to her job.
 Several years older than Donna and Louise.

Series 1

Series 2

Cancellation
Pulling was unexpectedly not renewed for a third series by BBC Three controller Danny Cohen, despite Kelly and Horgan both wanting to write another series. Instead the channel opted for a one-hour-special to "tie up loose ends" of the show's narrative.

The Guardian reported that news of the cancellation "perplexed those involved with the show" and that "insiders criticised Cohen's decision" especially as Pulling had "nearly doubled its [viewing] figures" since the first series and had "outperformed BBC3's average share both for the slot and for prime time in 2007, beating the slot average by 41% for the younger demographic". The show had also fared well critically and had been nominated for a BAFTA award. The newspaper reported that they had "sources" who had "claimed the decision was because the show no longer fitted in with the target audience of BBC3, which is being focused on a younger age group". However, this reasoning was denied by a BBC spokeswoman and controller Danny Cohen. Commenting on the cancellation Cohen said: "Pulling has had two fantastic series on BBC3 and we've committed to an hour-long finale episode as a mark of its quality". He justified the decision by saying that he had to cancel the series to make a room for new shows on the channel: "In an ideal world, we would recommission many more of our comedies - but on BBC3 we have to continually make room for the new. Every recommission means one less space for a new project."

In response to the news of the show's cancellation The Guardian published an article, 'Popular but pulled', about various popular TV shows that have been unexpectedly axed. The article reported that "Irate supporters [of the show] set up a Facebook page called Save Pulling. At the time of writing [April 2009], however, the group only had 1,049 members - with a good third of those being media or comedy professionals." Kelly was also quoted as saying that "We were quite disappointed - and quite surprised - by the decision to cancel as the show was doing really well, had won awards and I believed Danny [Cohen, BBC3 controller] liked it." Cohen however stated that "We didn't cancel Pulling, we just commissioned it in a different form [as a special]".

In a 2010 interview Kelly and Horgan claimed that they still didn't understand why the BBC refused to make a third series, with Kelly saying that they both "cried" and "threw ourselves at their feet" in desperation to have another series made.

2009 episode

Home media
Both series have been released on DVD, although the final episode has only been released as a digital download in the UK. The final episode was included in the Region 4 DVD set available in Australasia.

References

External links
 

Pulling website at bbc.co.uk
Pulling at British TV Comedy
Pulling at the British Comedy Guide
"BBC get it badly, badly wrong by cancelling Pulling" article at TV Scoop

2006 British television series debuts
2009 British television series endings
2000s British black comedy television series
2000s British sex comedy television series
2000s British sitcoms
BBC high definition shows
BBC television sitcoms
Casual sex in television
English-language television shows
Television series created by Sharon Horgan
Television shows set in London
Television series by Sony Pictures Television